Marcus Atilius Regulus was a Roman statesman and general who was a consul of the Roman Republic in 267 BC and 256 BC. Much of his career was spent fighting the Carthaginians during the first Punic War. In 256 BC, he and Lucius Manlius Vulso Longus defeated the Carthaginians at the massive naval battle off Cape Ecnomus; afterwards he led the Roman expedition to Africa but was defeated at the Bagradas River in spring of 255 BC. He was captured and then probably died of natural causes.

Life

Regulus was first consul in 267 BC. He campaigned with his co-consul (Lucius Julius Libo) against the Sallentini, captured Brundisium, and thence celebrated a double triumph. During the first Punic War, he then was elected suffect consul in 256 BC, in place of Quintus Caedicius, who had died in office. With his colleague, Lucius Manlius Vulso Longus, he fought and defeated a large Carthaginian fleet off the coast of Sicily – the Battle of Cape Ecnomus – and the two then invaded North Africa, landing at Aspis on the eastern side of the Cape Bon peninsula. 

After a siege, the consuls ravaged the countryside and seized some twenty thousand war captives. Manlius was recalled to Rome and celebrated a naval triumph, while Regulus captured Tunis and entered negotiations with Carthage. While crossing the river Bagradas, his forces supposedly fought an enormous serpent. During the siege of Adys, some 24 kilometres south of Carthage, the Carthaginians attacked over unfavourable hilly ground, triggering the Battle of Adys, which the Romans won. Wintering in Tunis, Regulus engaged in negotiations with the Carthaginians but offered very harsh terms that were rejected; Scullard, in the Cambridge Ancient History, rejects the claims given in Dio that Regulus' terms were so harsh as to "amount to a complete surrender" as "scarcely reliable". Scullard believes that it is more likely that the Romans would have required Carthage to vacate Sicily; the Carthaginians, unwilling to leave the western half of the island, would have refused such a demand.

His command was prorogued into 255 BC. That spring, the Carthaginians, buttressed by the arrival of Spartan mercenaries under Xanthippus and bristling against Regulus' proposals of harsh terms, fought Regulus at the Battle of the Bagradas River. On a plain, which gave the Carthaginians space to utilise their war elephants and cavalry, Regulus was defeated and captured; only some two thousand Romans escaped the battle and were picked up by the Roman navy before being wrecked by a storm. Regulus died of neglect or starvation in captivity, though his fate "was soon embellished by legend".

Legends of death 
The legend that the Carthaginians returned him to Rome to negotiate for a prisoner exchange or peace terms only for him to oppose any such exchange or terms and consequently be returned to the Carthaginians to be tortured to death, is "almost certainly invented, perhaps to palliate his son's torturing of two Punic [Carthaginian] prisoners in revenge for his death". No evidence of his story appears in the best source on the period, Polybius. 

The first evidence of the tale emerges with fragments of Sempronius Tuditanus's history in 129 BC; in this story, after he purposefully sabotages the negotiations, the Carthaginians have him starved to death. According to Augustine of Hippo in City of God (5th century AD), using similar wording as Cicero in Pisonem, the Carthaginians "shut [Regulus] up in a narrow box, in which he was compelled to stand, and in which finely sharpened nails were fixed all round about him, so that he could not lean upon any part of it without intense pain".

The myth of Regulus' capture and patriotic defiance later became a favourite tale for Roman children and patriotic story-tellers, developed and polished through the years by Roman historiographers and orators.

Family

The Atilii Reguli were a plebeian family. This Regulus was the brother of the Gaius Atilius Regulus who was consul in 257 and 250 BC. With a wife named Marcia, he had at least one son, also named Marcus, who later became consul in 227 and 217 BC before also being elected censor in 214 BC. Klaus Zmeskal, in Adfinitas, includes no linkage between this Regulus and the homonymous consul of 294 BC.

See also
 Cato the Elder
 Cincinnatus
 Horatii
 Publius Decius Mus

Notes

References

 
 

External links 
 

4th-century BC births
250 BC deaths
3rd-century BC Roman consuls
Regulus, Marcus consul 487 AUC
Characters in Book VI of the Aeneid
Ancient Roman admirals
Roman commanders of the First Punic War
Year of birth uncertain